Lubega is an Ugandan surname of Bantu origin and may refer to:
Bonnie Lubega (born 1929), Ugandan novelist
David Lubega (born 1975) aka Lou Bega, German singer and songwriter
Drake Lubega, Ugandan businessman
Edrisa Lubega (born 1998), Ugandan footballer 
Florence Alice Lubega (born 1917), Ugandan politician
Joseph Lubega (born 1982), Ugandan boxer

Bantu-language surnames